Whitford Hall is a historic home located in West Whiteland Township, Chester County, Pennsylvania. Built about 1796 by Richard Thomas, the house is a -story, five-bay brick dwelling in the Federal style. It has a gable roof with dormers, service wing, and frame additions.  Also on the property are a stone shed, tenant house, and carriage house. It is one of three surviving historic residences constructed by Richard Thomas, the others being Whitford Lodge and Ivy Cottage.

Whitford Hall was listed on the National Register of Historic Places in 1984.

References

Houses on the National Register of Historic Places in Pennsylvania
Federal architecture in Pennsylvania
Houses completed in 1796
Houses in Chester County, Pennsylvania
National Register of Historic Places in Chester County, Pennsylvania
1796 establishments in Pennsylvania